Von Wegen Lisbeth (English: "Because of Lisbeth" or "As if, Lisbeth!") is a German indie-pop band from Berlin that was founded in 2006 under the name Fluchtweg. The group sings in German; a special feature is the use of unusual musical instruments such as a children's ɡlockenspiel.

History 
The band was founded when the members were in seventh grade at the Beethoven-Gymnasium in Berlin, after sports lessons were cancelled due to the teacher having called in sick. They have described their earlier musical style as "from hardcore punk to 8-bit Gameboy Casio music". After high school, all band members started studying subjects like architecture, film music, mathematics, electrical engineering and art. However, they took a break from university in order to focus on their first album and the associated tour.

In 2014, Von Wegen Lisbeth went on tour as the supporting act to AnnenMayKantereit, and in November they released their EP “Und plötzlich der Lachs”. This was followed by 18 more concerts with AnnenMayKantereit at the beginning of 2015, and their first tour as headliner called "Störung im Betriebsablauf" at the end of the year.

After they went on tour with Element of Crime and again AnnenMayKantereit in early 2016., they released their debut album Grande on July 15, 2016, which was followed by a tour in September and October of the same year. They also played at several music festivals in 2016, such as the Appletree Garden Festival, the Kosmonaut Festival, Rocken am Brocken and the Fusion Festival. In 2018, they performed at the Campus Festival in Bielefeld as well as at the Deichbrand in Nordholz.

In 2019, the band released their second album sweetlilly93@hotmail.com. In the summer of 2019, they performed at numerous festivals like the Open Air Werden, the Taubertal-Festival and others. That same year, they also toured Germany, Austria and Switzerland with their “Britz-California”-tour, their fourth tour as headliners

Style 

Their song lyrics are mainly written by the band’s singer Matthias Rohde, who integrates everyday situations and conversations into his songs.

“These are all everyday experiences that you unconsciously pick up. The basic ideas are usually autobiographical, but when developing the lyrics, I add a lot of stuff.”

Characteristic for their musical style are instruments such as an electronic Casio-Keyboard or a steel drum, which the band has partly borrowed or bought from an opera house.

Discography

Studio albums

Live albums

EPs 

 2012: Promo 2012 (first publication: November 20, 2012)
 2014: Und plötzlich der Lachs (And Suddenly the Salmon)  (Chateau Lala, first publication: November 1, 2014)

Awards 

 2017: Deutscher Musikautorenpreis (German Music Authors' Prize): Young Talent Award
 2017: ECHO – Best Video National, Single Bitch

References

External links
 Official Website
 
 Von Wegen Lisbeth on laut.de
 Von Wegen Lisbeth on Discogs

Musical groups from Berlin
Indie pop groups
German indie rock groups
Musical groups established in 2006